Hans Egill Hansen (1 June 1915 – 17 July 2005) was a Norwegian competition rower and Olympic medalist. He received a bronze medal in men's eight at the 1948 Summer Olympics, as a member of the Norwegian team.

References

1915 births
2005 deaths
Norwegian male rowers
Olympic rowers of Norway
Rowers at the 1948 Summer Olympics
Olympic bronze medalists for Norway
Olympic medalists in rowing
Medalists at the 1948 Summer Olympics